Yeung Siu Hang is a village in Tuen Mun District, Hong Kong.

Administration
Yeung Siu Hang is a recognized village under the New Territories Small House Policy. It is one of the 36 villages represented within the Tuen Mun Rural Committee. For electoral purposes, Yeung Siu Hang is part of the Lung Mun constituency.

References

External links

 Delineation of area of existing village Yeung Siu Hang (Tuen Mun) for election of resident representative (2019 to 2022)

Villages in Tuen Mun District, Hong Kong